The Grand Trunk steamship Prince Rupert and her sister ship  served the coast of British Columbia and Alaska. Prince Rupert had a 45-year career serving northern ports from Vancouver, British Columbia, from 1910 to 1955. The ship was considered "unlucky" and suffered several incidents during her career, including two significant ones that left large portions of the vessel underwater. The ship was broken up in 1956.

Design and description
This powered two four-cylinder triple expansion engines creating driving two screws creating . The vessel burned coal for fuel initially, converting to oil in 1912. The passenger ship had large bilge keels to reduce rolling in heavy seas. The ship had two masts and three funnels.

The passenger ship had a passenger capacity of 1,756; 220 First class, 36 Second class and 1,500 excursionists on the promenade deck. In 1916, Prince Rupert was given limited staterooms for second-class travellers. Six four-berth and one two-berth staterooms were installed. Prince Rupert also had a refrigerated freight capacity of 350 tons.

Service history
Prince Rupert was ordered from Swan Hunter & Wigham Richardson and was constructed at their shipyard at Wallsend-on-Tyne. The passenger ship was launched on 13 December 1909 and completed in March 1910. Upon arrival on the West Coast of Canada, Prince Rupert was used for express service between Vancouver, Victoria, Prince Rupert, Stewart, Anyox, the Queen Charlotte Islands and Seattle. The ship arrived at her namesake town for the first time on 15 June 1910. In 1912, Prince Rupert underwent conversion from coal-burning to oil-burning fuel, which was performed by the B.C. Marine Railway Company at Esquimalt, British Columbia.

Beginning in 1916, Prince Rupert began her career as an "unlucky ship". On 28 December 1916, the vessel was involved in a collision with the tugboat Cleeve in Vancouver Harbour. The following year on 23 March, the ship ran aground on Genn Island while leaving Anyox during a gale. Prince Rupert was eventually lifted off the rocks and spent two months in dry dock at Prince Rupert undergoing repairs.

On 1 May 1918, the ship's screws were stripped and Prince Rupert was forced to dock at Victoria for repairs. On 14 January 1919 she was struck by lightning in Vancouver Harbour. In October that year, the ship suffered a fire in her cargo hold, and underwent $25,000 in repairs. On 20 September 1920, the vessel struck a reef in Swanson Bay and tore a  hole in the bottom of the hull. Prince Rupert was beached and the passengers and crew landed. However, at high tide, the ship became completely submerged except for sections of the bridge and upper deck.

The ship was salvaged by the Pacific Salvage Company of Vancouver. The entire cofferdam took  of lumber which was bolted to the sides of the ship with the crevices with heavy canvas. The structure added a further 200 tons to the vessel. Prince Rupert was then raised to the surface and towed to Victoria where the ship underwent repairs at Yarrows, remaining out of service until May 1921. From 1925, ownership of both Prince Rupert and Prince George was transferred along with the Grand Trunk Pacific Railway system to the Government of Canada to be operated as part of the Canadian National Railway.

On 22 August 1927, Prince Rupert went aground on Ripple Rock. Captain Andy Johnson of the competing Union Steamship Company of British Columbia manoeuvred his ship  alongside and pulled Prince Rupert off the reef, saving the vessel from almost certain disaster. Cardena towed Prince Rupert into Deep Cove where Cardena and Princess Beatrice removed passengers, baggage and cargo. Prince Rupert was then towed by two tugboats to Vancouver, where the ship was repaired by Burrard Dry Dock. 

To prevent further rolling, the ship was fastened to the dock by its masts. Prince Rupert was raised once again and following a month-long refit, was ready for service again. 

On 4 September 1935, she overtook and rammed the American 28-gross register ton halibut-fishing vessel Anna J near Maud Island (from where Ripple Rock was blasted in Seymour Narrows) on the British Columbia coast; Anna J beached herself in Plumper Bay after the collision and became a total loss.

After the collision with Anna J, Prince Ruperts service remained quiet until 1951. On 20 August 1951, Prince Rupert rammed the cruise liner Princess Kathleen north of Prince Rupert. Prince Rupert cut a  v-shaped hole in the port bow of Princess Kathleen, cutting halfway through the main deck. Princess Kathleen suffered $250,000 in damage and Prince Rupert, $100,000. Both ships were deemed at fault by the Admiralty. Prince Rupert was taken out of service in April 1955. The ship was sold for scrap in 1956. Purchased by Rinko Iron Works, a Japanese salvage company, the ship was renamed SS Prince Maru. The vessel was then taken to Osaka, Japan and broken up in August 1956.

See also
List of ships in British Columbia

Notes

Citations

Sources

External links

1909 ships
History of British Columbia
Ships built by Swan Hunter
Steamboats of Alaska
Water transport in British Columbia
Hospital ships of Canada
Maritime incidents in 1916
Maritime incidents in 1917
Maritime incidents in 1918
Maritime incidents in 1919
Maritime incidents in 1920
Maritime incidents in 1927
Maritime incidents in 1931
Maritime incidents in 1935
Maritime incidents in 1951